Harlem Tommy Murphy (April 13, 1885 – November 26, 1958) was an American boxer whose career lasted from 1903 to 1917. He was a contender in three different divisions; being ranked in the bantamweight, featherweight and lightweight weight classes. During his tenure as a fighter, he squared off against some of the greatest boxers of all-time, including Abe Attell,  Packey McFarland, Terry McGovern, Ad Wolgast and Harry Harris.

Notable bouts

References

External links

 

1885 births
1958 deaths
Boxers from New York (state)
International Boxing Hall of Fame inductees
American male boxers
Bantamweight boxers